Porpomiris is a genus of plant bugs in the family Miridae. There are at least three described species in Porpomiris.

Species
These three species belong to the genus Porpomiris:
 Porpomiris campinensis Carvalho, 1947
 Porpomiris curtulus (Reuter, 1909)
 Porpomiris picturatus Berg, 1883

References

Further reading

 
 
 

Miridae genera
Articles created by Qbugbot
Stenodemini